John Robert Lamont (born 15 April 1976) is a Scottish Conservative Party politician and solicitor who has served in the British House of Commons as the Member of Parliament (MP) for Berwickshire, Roxburgh and Selkirk since 2017. Lamont previously served as the Member of the Scottish Parliament (MSP) for Roxburgh and Berwickshire, later Ettrick, Roxburgh and Berwickshire after boundary changes, from 2007 to 2017. He has been serving as Parliamentary Under-Secretary of State for Scotland since October 2022.

Early life 
John Lamont was born on 15 April 1976 in Kilwinning to Robert and Elizabeth Lamont. He was educated at Kilwinning Academy and studied at the School of Law of the University of Glasgow where he gained a first class honours degree. He worked as a solicitor at Freshfields in London and then at Brodies in Edinburgh.

Political career 
In 2002, Lamont stood as a candidate in the London Borough of Lambeth in the Brixton ward where he finished in 10th place. As well as becoming involved in local politics, he became the Chairman of his local Conservative association and was the Conservative candidate for Berwickshire, Roxburgh and Selkirk at the 2005, 2010 and 2015 general elections.

In May 2007, Lamont was elected Member of the Scottish Parliament for Roxburgh and Berwickshire. In the 2011 Scottish Parliament election, he won the newly constituted Ettrick, Roxburgh and Berwickshire seat with an increased majority. As an MSP, he served as Scottish Conservative Chief Whip and Parliamentary Business Manager. From 1 March to 22 March 2011, Lamont was briefly Convener of the Justice Committee following the resignation of Bill Aitken. He caused controversy in May 2011, for accusing Catholic education in the west of Scotland to be 'state-sponsored conditioning of sectarian attitudes'. Following the resignation of Annabel Goldie as the Scottish Conservative leader, Lamont had been tipped as a potential candidate to replace her, however he reportedly 'self-destructed' his chances following his remarks on Catholic schools. In November 2017, it emerged that Lamont's local party had accepted a £2,000 donation from one of the funders of the Global Warming Policy Foundation, a self-proclaimed "climate sceptic" organisation.

Lamont announced his intention to stand down from this Holyrood seat effective 4 May 2017 to stand at the 2017 snap election for the Berwickshire, Roxburgh and Selkirk seat. As a constituency MSP, Lamont's resignation triggered a by-election in the constituency, which was won by Rachael Hamilton of the Scottish Conservatives. In June 2017, he was elected Member of Parliament for Berwickshire, Roxburgh and Selkirk, with a majority of 11,060 votes; which made the constituency the safest Conservative seat in Scotland. He was re-elected to serve as MP at the December 2019 general election, but with a lower vote count of 48.4% and a majority of 5,148.

Lamont was given the role of Parliamentary Private Secretary to the Foreign Office in November 2021. He resigned from this position on 6 June 2022 in order to vote against Boris Johnson in the vote of no confidence. He was previously critical of Johnson over the parties in Number 10 during lockdown, saying it was "sickening" to read about them.

Personal life
In 2014 he became the first UK politician to complete an Ironman Triathlon and was the fastest MP in the 2018 London Marathon, running to raise funds for MND Scotland and the My Name's Doddie Foundation. He also ran the 2019 London Marathon, raising money for Marie Curie Daffodil Appeal.

References

External links
johnlamont.org Website of John Lamont MP

John Lamont MSP Biography Biography at Scottish Conservatives website
 

Conservative MSPs
1976 births
Scottish solicitors
Alumni of the University of Glasgow
Living people
Members of the Scottish Parliament 2007–2011
Members of the Scottish Parliament 2011–2016
Members of the Scottish Parliament 2016–2021
People from Kilwinning
Scottish Conservative Party MPs
UK MPs 2017–2019
UK MPs 2019–present
People educated at Kilwinning Academy